This article details the fixtures and results of the Bahrain national football team in 2008.

Results

References 

Bahrain national football team
2008 national football team results
2007–08 in Bahraini football
2008–09 in Bahraini football